Leopold Town may refer to:
Leopoldstadt, a municipality of Vienna, Austria
Lipótváros, a neighborhood in Budapest, Hungary